Dr. Arturo Morales Carrión,  as Gov. Rafael Hernández Colón eulogized him, "one of the principal figures" in the history of Puerto Rico.  Born November 16, 1913, in Havana, Cuba, of Puerto Rican parentage, he died in June, 1989 in San Juan, Puerto Rico, after having served under Gov. Luis Muñoz Marín as Under Secretary of State of Puerto Rico, under President John F. Kennedy as Deputy Assistant Secretary of State for Inter-American Affairs, as special assistant to the Secretary General of the Organization of American States and as President of the University of Puerto Rico (1973-1977).

Early life

Born in on November 17, 1913 Havana, Cuba of Puerto Rican parents, he studied at the Vila Mayo High School, and graduated in 1931 from the University High School (UHS), the alma mater of many prominent Puerto Ricans, before obtaining a B. A. degree, majoring in History and Political Science from UPR in 1935.  He obtained an M.A. in Latin American Studies from the University of Texas at Austin in 1936 and, later in life, obtained his Ph.D. in History and Government from Columbia University in 1950.  In 1948 he married Inés Arandes Rexach, with whom he had two sons, Arturo and Edgardo, and one daughter, Inés Morales Arandes.

Public life

In 1953, Gov. Muñoz and Secretary of State Roberto Sánchez Vilella appointed Morales Carrión as Under Secretary of State, the position held for eleven of the past 22 years by José Rodríguez Suárez, and a post he held until 1961 for eight years.  During that period, he spearheaded efforts to provide technical assistance to neighboring nations and promoting cultural exchanges.

In 1961, President Kennedy appointed Dr. Morales Carrión as Deputy Assistant Secretary of State for Inter-American Affairs until 1964, and helped organize the Alliance for Progress led by a fellow Puerto Rican, Teodoro Moscoso.

From 1964 to 1969, he served as Special Assistant to the Secretary General of the OAS.

Back in Puerto Rico, in 1973, he was chosen as President of UPR, a post he held until 1977.  At UPR, he had earlier been chairman of its History Department, founded decades ago by Dr. Pilar Barbosa.  At UPR, and as its president, he created the Center for Historic Research.  He also founded the Puerto Rico Foundation of the Humanities and served as its Executive Director until his death in 1989.

Throughout his life, he served as Visiting Professor at innumerable institutions of higher learning, including Harvard University. Columbia University, George Washington University and the University of Miami, as well as other universities in the Caribbean and Latin America.

Death

Arturo Morales Carrión died on June 28, 1989, in San Juan, Puerto Rico. He was buried at Santa María Magdalena de Pazzis Cemetery in San Juan, Puerto Rico.

Honors and recognitions

Thirteen years after his death, the Interamerican University of Puerto Rico published a 1,000-plus page biography of Morales Carrión, edited by professor Héctor Luis Acevedo, that was presented at the Puerto Rico State Department on Nov. 14, 2012, with Acting Governor Kenneth McClintock offering remarks.

Selected publications

Puerto Rico: A Political and Cultural History. New York: W.W. Norton & Company, Inc. 1983. (in English)

History of the People of Puerto Rico (in Spanish)

Albores Históricos del Capitalismo en Puerto Rico, 1972 (in Spanish)

Sources

Centro Arturo Morales Carrión

Arturo Morales Carrión: Dimensiones del gran diplomático puertorriqueño, edited by Héctor Luis Acevedo, 2012, Interamerican University of Puerto Rico,  (in Spanish)

References

1913 births
1989 deaths
Burials at Santa María Magdalena de Pazzis Cemetery
Cuban emigrants to Puerto Rico
20th-century Puerto Rican politicians
20th-century Puerto Rican historians
Presidents of the University of Puerto Rico
University of Texas at Austin College of Liberal Arts alumni
Columbia Graduate School of Arts and Sciences alumni
Heads of universities and colleges in the United States
Historians of Puerto Rico
20th-century American academics